Seventh Avenue – co-named Fashion Avenue in the Garment District and known as Adam Clayton Powell Jr. Boulevard north of Central Park – is a thoroughfare on the West Side of the borough of Manhattan in New York City. It is southbound below Central Park and a two-way street north of the park.

Seventh Avenue originates in the West Village at Clarkson Street, where Varick Street becomes Seventh Avenue South (which becomes Seventh Avenue proper after the road crosses Greenwich Avenue and West 11th Street). It is interrupted by Central Park from 59th to 110th Street. Artisans' Gate is the 59th Street exit from Central Park to Seventh Avenue. North of Warriors' Gate at the north end of the Park, the avenue carries traffic in both directions through Harlem, where it is called Adam Clayton Powell Jr. Boulevard. Addresses continue as if the street was continuous through Central Park, with the first block north of the park being the 1800 block. The United States Postal Service delivers mail using either street name. As is the case with "Sixth Avenue" and "Avenue of the Americas", long-time New Yorkers continue to use the older name.

The street has two northern termini; an upper level terminates at the western end of the Macombs Dam Bridge, traveling over the Harlem River, where Jerome Avenue commences in the Bronx. A lower level continues a bit further north and curves into the lower level of West 155th Street.

History
Seventh Avenue was originally laid out in the Commissioners' Plan of 1811.

The southern terminus of Seventh Avenue was Eleventh Street in Greenwich Village through the early part of the 20th century. It was extended southward, as Seventh Avenue South, to link up with Varick Street in 1914, and Varick was widened at the same time. Extension of the avenue allowed better vehicular connections between midtown Manhattan and the commercial district in what is now TriBeCa. It also permitted construction of the New York City Subway IRT Broadway – Seventh Avenue Line which opened in 1918.

Extension of the avenue was under consideration for several years, and was approved by the New York City Board of Estimate in September 1911, when the first $3 million appropriation was made for the initial planning of the work. The extension had been urged by civic groups to meet the commercial needs of Greenwich Village. A significant number of old buildings were marked for demolition in the extension, and the demolished buildings included the Bedford Street Methodist Church, constructed in 1840.

Most of Seventh Avenue has carried traffic one-way southbound since June 6, 1954. The portion north of Times Square carried two-way traffic until March 10, 1957.

Transportation

Notable districts and buildings

South of 14th Street Seventh Avenue is a major thoroughfare in the West Village. The now dismantled St. Vincent's Hospital was a main downtown hospital on Seventh Avenue and 11th Street.

Running through the Garment District (which stretches from 12th Avenue to 5th Avenue and 34th Street to 39th Street), it is referred to as Fashion Avenue due to its role as a center of the garment and fashion industry and the famed fashion designers who established New York as the world fashion capital. The first, temporary signs designating the section of Seventh Avenue as "Fashion Avenue" were dual-posted in 1972, with permanent signs added over the ensuing years.

Seventh Avenue intersects with Broadway and with 42nd Street at Times Square, with multiple buildings at the intersections.

Notable buildings located on Seventh Avenue include:

 Alwyn Court Apartments, 58th Street
 Carnegie Hall, Osborne Apartments, and Rodin Studios, 57th Street
 AXA Center (originally The Equitable Tower), at 51st Street
 Madison Square Garden and Penn Station, 32nd Street
 Fashion Institute of Technology, 27th Street

Notable buildings on Adam Clayton Powell Jr. Boulevard, from Central Park north through Harlem, include:

 Adam Clayton Powell Jr. State Office Building
 Hotel Theresa

See also
 6½ Avenue

References
Notes

External links

 New York Songlines: Seventh Avenue, a virtual walking tour

 
07
West Village
Greenwich Village
Chelsea, Manhattan
Times Square
Harlem